Gilles Holst (20 March 1886 – 11 October 1968) was a Dutch physicist, known worldwide for his invention in 1932 of the low-pressure sodium lamp.

Early life
His father was a manager of a shipyard. In 1904 he went to ETH Zurich to study mechanical engineering, changing after a year to mathematics and physics.

Career
He worked with Balthasar van der Pol, known for the Van der Pol oscillator, and Frans Michel Penning, known for Penning ionization and the Penning mixture. In 1908 he became a geprüfter Fachlehrer, or qualified teacher. And most important, 
he became the science director of the Philips Physics Laboratory in Eindhoven.

In 1909 he became an assistant to Heike Kamerlingh Onnes at Leiden University. At Leiden, it is believed that he was the first to witness the phenomenon of superconductivity.

The Gilles Holst Award was first awarded in 1939.

Personal life
He died in Holland at the age of 82.

References

External links
 Holst Centre 

1886 births
1968 deaths
20th-century Dutch physicists
ETH Zurich alumni
Academic staff of Leiden University
Members of the Royal Netherlands Academy of Arts and Sciences
Superconductivity